Deadly Lullabyes Live is a live album from King Diamond, which was recording during The Puppet Master promotion tour. It spans two discs. The album features only recordings from the United States part of the tour.

Track listing

Disc one
 "Funeral"
 "A Mansion in Darkness"
 "The Family Ghost"
 "Black Horsemen"
 "Spare This Life"
 "Mansion in Sorrow"
 "Spirits"
 "Sorry Dear"
 "Eye of the Witch"
 "Sleepless Nights"

Disc two
 "The Puppet Master"
 "Blood to Walk"
 "So Sad"
 "Living Dead"
 "Welcome Home"
 "The Invisible Guests"
 "Burn"
 ""Introductions""
 "Halloween"
 "No Presents for Christmas"

Credits
King Diamond - Vocals
Andy LaRocque - Guitar
Mike Wead - Guitar
Hal Patino - Bass
Matt Thompson - Drums
Livia Zita - Additional Vocals
Jodi Cachia - Actress
Øystein Wierli - Live sound

References

King Diamond albums
2004 live albums
Massacre Records live albums